The Red Bull RB5 is a Formula One racing car designed by the Red Bull Racing team for the 2009 Formula One season. It was driven by Sebastian Vettel, who drove for Red Bull's sister team Toro Rosso in the 2008 season, and Mark Webber. The car was launched on 9 February 2009 at the Circuito de Jerez in Spain.

The car gave the team its first pole position, first win and first ever 1–2 finish at the 2009 Chinese Grand Prix. Over the course of the season the car turned out to be competitive as it won 6 out of 17 races, with Vettel winning four races and Webber winning two. As a result, the team finished 2nd in the Constructors' Championship standings behind Brawn GP and Vettel finished second in the Drivers' Championship standings behind Jenson Button. In July 2010, Red Bull gifted designer Adrian Newey a complete RB5 car as a "thank you" gift for turning Red Bull into a title-challenging team. Newey first drove the car at the hill at the Goodwood Festival of Speed.

Technical specifications 

New rules in place for the 2009 season required cars to have narrower and higher rear wings and wider and lower front wings, designed to reduce air disturbance to following cars and hence make overtaking easier. Slick tyres were re-introduced into Formula One, after being absent since 1998. This was expected to increase the RB5's tyre grip by about 20%.

There was a possibility that the RB5 could feature a Kinetic Energy Recovery System (KERS), which would allow energy which would otherwise be wasted while braking to be re-used in set amounts per lap, via a boost button on the driver's steering wheel. This was the result of new rules for the 2009 season. Red Bull originally attempted to develop their own system, but a factory fire resulting from overheated batteries stalled progress. In January 2009 Red Bull announced that they would use an identical KERS system to the Renault team, in an extension of the existing customer engine deal between the teams. However the RB5 never did race with KERS.

2009 season

Launch
The RB5 was launched later than most of its rivals, to allow a longer development time at the expense of a shorter testing time. Red Bull expected the RB5 to be more competitive than its predecessor, the RB4, which achieved a single podium in 2008. Vettel was optimistic when questioned about the car's potential:

Sebastian Vettel, who (since joining Scuderia Toro Rosso) makes it a habit to name his racing cars, named his Red Bull RB5 'Kate' and after crashing it at Melbourne's Albert Park, he named his new chassis 'Kate's Dirty Sister'.

Testing 

Initial tests of the RB5 at Jerez were halted when high gearbox oil temperatures were detected. When the issue was resolved the RB5 was the quickest 2009 specification car at Jerez, where Vettel was faster than the equivalent Williams, McLaren and Renault cars. Webber returned to the cockpit after breaking his leg while cycling in November 2008; he completed 83 laps in the RB5, around the distance of a Grand Prix, and reported no problems whilst lapping faster than Vettel the previous day.

Season performance
Early in the season the car showed huge performance with Vettel taking the first win for the team in China with Webber in second place giving the team their first 1-2 ever. As the season progressed the car continued to show its pace and by the mid-season its pace had increased to the point where it had overtaken the Brawn BGP 001 as the fastest car on the grid.

The car started the season with a narrow needle like nose (as was the common practice for that year.) This design was used by Red Bull for the remainder of the V8 era.

Complete Formula One results 
(key) (results in bold indicate pole position; results in italics indicate fastest lap)

 Driver failed to finish, but was classified as they had completed >90% of the race distance.
 Half points awarded as less than 75% of race distance completed.

References

External links 

2009 Formula One season cars
Red Bull RB05